The basilica of San Nazaro in Brolo or San Nazaro Maggiore is a 4th-century Roman Catholic church in Milan, region of Lombardy, Italy.

History and Description
Putatively the church was commissioned in 382 by St Ambrose, to be built along the road that connected Milan (then Mediolanum) to Rome. Originally dedicated to the Apostles, and the church was known as the Basilica Apostolorum. As explained by an inscription in the church written by Ambrose himself, the church's plan was on the Greek Cross with apses on the arms, a feature present only in the Church of the Holy Apostles in Constantinople. In front of the basilica was a porticoed atrium. Under the basilica's altar were housed relics of the Apostles, which are still present. In 397, when the body of St. Nazarus was discovered, a new apse was created. Serena, niece of emperor Theodosius I, donated the marbles for the sacellum housing the relics and also embellished the rest of the church.

The apse of the right arm has a portal with a false porch. The ceiling of the nave, originally consisting of wooden spans, was replaced by a groin vault during the Middle Ages. The walls are original. Also in this age the Romanesque-style octagonal tambour, featuring a circular loggia with small columns, was added over the arms' crossing.

Starting in 1512, Bramantino built the Trivulzio Mausoleum, an octagonal chapel. Commissioned by the Condotierre Giangiacomo Trivulzio, he awkwardly constructed this chapel to be placed before the facade, instead of as a side chapel.

From the left transept, one enters the Chapel of St. Catherine of Alexandria, designed and built circa 1540 by Antonio da Lonate. In this chapel is a large frescoed arch depicting the Martyrdom of St. Catherine (1548-1549) by Bernardino Lanino and Giovan Battista della Cerva.

Gallery

See also
 History of medieval Arabic and Western European domes
 History of early modern period domes
 Early Christian churches in Milan

Further reading
Weitzmann, Kurt, ed., Age of spirituality: late antique and early Christian art, third to seventh century, no. 585, 1979, Metropolitan Museum of Art, New York,

References

External links

San Nazaro
4th-century churches
San Nazaro
San Nazaro